A cockernonnie or cockernonie was an old Scottish women's hairstyle. It was a gathering up of the hair, after a fashion similar to the modern chignon, and sometimes called a "cock-up". Mr. Kirkton of Edinburgh, preaching against "cock-ups" – of which chignons were the representative in the mid-19th century – said:

"I have spent all this year preaching against the vanity of women, yet I see my own daughter in the kirk even now, with as high a 'cock-up' as any of you all."

Etymology of "cock-up" 

"Cock-up" is in common usage as another term for "foul-up" in British English. For example, "The Ministry of Defence's programme to make airworthy the eight Chinook Mk3 helicopters, which it acquired in 2001 for special operations work, has been a gold standard cock-up."

The contemporary British English usage of "cock-up" likely derives from the nautical usage of the term to describe an arrangement of the yards of a square-rigged vessel in port, and therefore likely predates the cockernonnie derivation suggested above, square-rigged vessels being in use considerably before most of the Scots references quoted here. It is possible the term has two completely unrelated origins; however, contemporary common usage is more likely to derive from the nautical term, which has an explicit association with foul-up, rather than the Scots term.

Modern folk etymology has sometimes suggested that "cock-up" refers to a male erection, or to the phrase "cacked up", but this is untrue.

Etymology of "cockernonnie" 

John Jamieson was of the opinion that "cockernonnie" signified a snood, or gathering of the hair in a band or fillet. Sir Walter Scott used the term in his novels:

"But I doubt the daughter's a silly thing: an unco cockernony she had busked up on her head at the kirk last Sunday." (Old Mortality, 1816)

And

"My gude name! If ony body touched my gude name I would fash neither council nor commissary. I would be down upon them like a sea-falcon among a wheen wild geese, and the best of them that dared to say onything o' Meg Dods, but what was honest and civil, I would soon see if her cockenonie was made o' her ain hair or other folks." (St. Ronan's Well, 1824)

See also
 List of hairstyles

References

 MacKay, Charles – A Dictionary of Lowland Scotch (1888)

Hairstyles
Scottish society